"Change" is a song written by Holly Knight and originally recorded by her then-band, Spider, who released the song on their 1981 second album, Between the Lines.

John Waite recording
The following year, English musician John Waite, newly a solo artist after fronting The Babys, recorded a version. It was released in 1982 as his debut single from his Chrysalis Records debut album Ignition. The song reached No. 16 on the Billboard Album Rock Tracks chart. It was aided by a hugely popular MTV music video featuring Tina Gullickson, an actress and model, who has been a part of Jimmy Buffett's Coral Reefer Band since 1995.

The song (Waite's version) was also featured on the 1985 Vision Quest soundtrack. The re-launched single entered the Billboard Hot 100 and climbed to No. 54.

References

1982 debut singles
John Waite songs
Songs written by Holly Knight
1981 songs
Chrysalis Records singles